Anthony or Tony Clark may refer to:

Anthony
A-One (graffiti artist) (1964–2001), American graffiti artist Anthony Clark
Anthony Clark (actor) (born 1964), American actor and comedian
Anthony Clark (badminton) (born 1977), English badminton player
Anthony Clark (cartoonist), colour artist for the comic Atomic Robo
Anthony Clark (cricketer) (born 1977), Australian cricketer
Anthony Clark (cyclist) (born 1987), American cyclo-cross cyclist
Anthony Clark (powerlifter) (1966–2005), American former holder of the World Record for bench press
Anthony Clark (footballer) (born 1984), English footballer
Anthony Clark (swimmer) Tahitian swimmer; see List of Tahitian records in swimming
Anthony E. Clark (born 1967), American Sinologist, historian, and writer
Anthony John Clark (1951–2004), English scientist who was part of the team that cloned Dolly the Sheep

Tony
Tony Clark, Blessid Union of Souls's bass guitarist
Tony Clark (born 1972), former professional baseball player
 Tony Clark (cinematographer), Australian cinematographer, founder and managing director of Rising Sun Pictures
Tony Clark (darts player) (born 1955), Welsh darts player
Tony Clark (footballer) (born 1977), retired English footballer
Tony Clark (politician) (born 1971), North Dakota Public Service Commissioner
Tony Clark (sport shooter) (1924–2009), British Olympic shooter

See also 
Anthony Clarke (disambiguation)
Antony Clark (born 1956), South African headmaster